Obadiah Newcomb Bush (January 28, 1797 – February 9, 1851) was an American prospector and businessman. He is an ancestor of the Bush political family. He was the father of James Smith Bush, grandfather of business magnate Samuel Prescott Bush, great-grandfather of former U.S. Senator Prescott Bush, great-great-grandfather of former U.S. President George H. W. Bush, and great-great-great-grandfather of former Texas Governor and U.S. President George W. Bush and former Florida Governor Jeb Bush.

Early life
Obadiah Newcomb Bush was born on January 18, 1797, in Penfield, New York. His father, Timothy Bush Jr. (1766–1850), was a blacksmith; his mother was Lydia Newcomb (1763–1835). His paternal grandfather, Capt. Timothy Bush Sr. (1735–1815), was an American Revolution militia captain.

Bush served in the War of 1812.

Career
Bush became a schoolmaster in Rochester, New York. He also served on a committee that nominated candidates for justice of the peace. He and his brother Henry, a manufacturer of stoves, were known abolitionists. He served as vice president of the American Anti-Slavery Society and supported the Underground Railroad. He petitioned the New York State Legislature to secede from the Union in a protest against slavery, after which The Rochester Daily Advertiser accused him of encouraging anarchy. Abigail Bush was the wife of his brother Henry.

In 1849, he travelled to California "with the forty-niners during the gold rush".

Personal life and death
Bush married Harriet Smith (1800–1867) in Rochester, New York on November 8, 1821. They had seven children, among them James Smith Bush. Following his years as a schoolmaster in New York, Bush traveled to the West Coast. Seeking to relocate there permanently, he set out for the East Coast by sea to wrap up his affairs. Bush died some time en route in 1851, and was apparently buried at sea.

References

Notes

1797 births
1851 deaths
American gold prospectors
American manufacturing businesspeople
Burials at sea
Bush family
Businesspeople from New York (state)
People who died at sea
Underground Railroad people
19th-century American politicians